South Carolina Highway 185 (SC 185) is a  state highway in the U.S. state of South Carolina. The highway connects Hodges and Due West with the Homeland Park area.

Route description
SC 185 begins at an intersection with US 178 (Old Shoals Junction Road) just southeast of Hodges, within Greenwood County. It travels to the northwest and nearly immediately enters the city limits of Hodges. SC 185 curves to the southwest and passes Hodges Elementary School before leaving town. The highway winds its way through rural areas of the county and enters Abbeville County just before crossing over Long Cane Creek. Approximately  later, it intersects the northern terminus of SC 203 (Old Douglas Mill Road). It then travels to the northwest, going through Arborville, before it begins a concurrency with SC 20 (Greenville Street). They cross over Park Creek just before entering Due West. At North Main Street, they meet SC 184, which joins the concurrency. The three highways travel through Erskine College and pass Erskine Theological Seminary. Immediately afterward, SC 20/SC 185 splits off onto Anderson Drive. Just after leaving town, the concurrency crosses over Chickasaw Creek. They cross over Little Hogskin Creek and Hogskin Creek before splitting, with SC 185 going to the northwest. The highway crosses over Little River and then enters Anderson County. After a crossing of Camp Creek, is an intersection with SC 284 (Trail Road) in Saylors Crossroads. The highway crosses over Bear and Hencoop creeks before intersecting SC 413 in Ebenezer Crossroads. The highway curves to the northwest and crosses over Rocky River and meets its northern terminus, an intersection with SC 28 (Abbeville Highway).

Major intersections

See also

References

External links

SC 185 South Carolina Hwy Index

185
Transportation in Greenwood County, South Carolina
Transportation in Abbeville County, South Carolina
Transportation in Anderson County, South Carolina